The 1910 Mississippi College Collegians football team represented Mississippi College as an independent during the 1910 college football season.

Schedule

References

Mississippi College
Mississippi College Choctaws football seasons
College football winless seasons
Mississippi College Collegians football